NFAT activating protein with ITAM motif 1 is a protein that in humans is encoded by the NFAM1 gene.

Function

The protein encoded by this gene is a type I membrane receptor that activates cytokine gene promoters such as the IL-13 and TNF-alpha promoters. The encoded protein contains an immunoreceptor tyrosine-based activation motif (ITAM) and is thought to regulate the signaling and development of B-cells. [provided by RefSeq, Jul 2008].

References

Further reading 

Human proteins
Chromosomes
Single-pass transmembrane proteins